Balod district of Chhattisgarh state has its headquarters at Balod.

It has District & Sessions Court which was inaugurated on 2 October 2013 by Hon'ble Shri Justice Sunil Kumar Sinha: Judge, Chhattisgarh High Court. Shri Deepak Kumar Tiwari is joined as first District & Sessions Judge at Balod.

Administration
In Balod First collector Mr. Amrit Khalko & First A.S.P. is Mr. D.L. Manhar.

Demographics 

The population of the district as per 2011 census is 826,165, of which 105,498 (12.77%) live in urban areas. Balod has a sex ratio of 1021 females per 1000 males. Scheduled Castes and Scheduled Tribes make up 8.28% and 31.36% of the population respectively.

As of the 2011 census, 93.07% of the population spoke Chhattisgarhi and 4.88% Hindi as their first language.

CBSE Affiliated Schools
Nirmala English Medium Senior Secondary School

References

External links 
 Official website

 
Districts of Chhattisgarh
States and territories established in 2013
2013 establishments in Chhattisgarh